Clanis hyperion is a species of moth of the family Sphingidae. It is found from Yunnan in southern China to northern Thailand and north-eastern India.

Adults are on wing from March to October in Thailand.

References

Clanis
Moths described in 1990